At the 1896 Summer Olympics, eight gymnastics events, all for men, were contested in Panathinaiko Stadium. They were organized and prepared by the Sub-Committee for Wrestling and Gymnastics. Events took place on April 9, April 10, and April 11, 1896. There were 71 competitors from         9 nations (including 52 from Greece) that took part in gymnastics.

Medal summary
These medals are retroactively assigned by the International Olympic Committee; at the time, winners were given a silver medal and subsequent places received no award.

Participating nations
A total of 71 gymnasts from 9 nations competed at the Athens Games:

Medal table

Sub-Committee for Wrestling and Gymnastics
 Joan. Phokianos, president
 George Streit, secretary
 Joan. Yenissarlis
 Loukas Belos
 Nic. Politis
 Chas. Waldstein
 Dimitri Aighinitis
 Dim. Sekkeris
 Spiridon Comoundouros
 Const. Manos
 Sp. Antonopoulos

See also

 List of Olympic medalists in gymnastics (men)

References

 International Olympic Committee results database
  (Digitally available at )
  (Excerpt available at )
 

 
1896 Summer Olympics events
1896
1896 in gymnastics